Kowloon City District is one of the 18 districts of Hong Kong. It is located in the city of Kowloon. It had a population of 381,352 in 2001, and increased to 418,732 in 2016. The district has the third most educated residents while its residents enjoy the highest income in Kowloon. It borders all the other districts in Kowloon, with Kwun Tong district to the east, Wong Tai Sin district to its northeast, Sham Shui Po district to its northwest, and Yau Tsim Mong district to its southwest.

Kowloon City district covers about 1,000 hectares, and is mainly a residential area; most of its people live in private sector housing, including old tenement buildings, private residential developments and low-rise villas; the rest of them mainly live in public rental housing and the Home Ownership Scheme estates. It is the only district that incorporated into the land of Hong Kong in different stages (Convention of Peking, Convention for the Extension of Hong Kong Territory and the demolition of the Kowloon Walled City)

The district includes many notable areas of Kowloon, such as Ho Man Tin, Hung Hom, Kai Tak Airport, Kowloon Tong, Ma Tau Wai, To Kwa Wan, and Whampoa Garden, and the proper Kowloon City, from where it derives its namesake.

History
According to reliable historical records such as the History book of Song Dynasty, emperor Emperor Duanzong (Zhao Shi) and emperor Zhao Bing took refuge in nowadays Kowloon City District. Sung Wong Toi was a remarkable monument during that era. 

Part of the district was the location of the original Kowloon Walled City, see Kowloon Walled City. This is now Walled City Park.

The former airport, Kai Tak International Airport was also located in the district; part of it will be re-developed to be Kai Tak Cruise Terminal. In 1982, the Hong Kong Government decided to divide Hong Kong into 18 administrative districts, and Kowloon City and its neighbouring areas such as Hung Hom now belongs to Kowloon City District.

Areas

 Kadoorie Hill

Sights
Kowloon Walled City Park
Sung Wong Toi Park
Holy Trinity Cathedral

Education

 Universities
Hong Kong Baptist University (Kowloon Tong main campus)
Open University of Hong Kong (Ho Man Tin main campus)

See also
List of places in Hong Kong

References

External links

Kowloon City District Council
List and map of electoral constituencies (large PDF file)